The 39th running of the Tour of Flanders cycling classic was held on Sunday, 27 March 1955. French rider Louison Bobet won the race in a three-man sprint with Hugo Koblet and Rik Van Steenbergen. 47 of 203 riders finished.

Race Report
Rik Van Steenbergen was in an early breakaway with 12 riders and was first on the Kluisberg and Kruisberg. In Geraardsbergen, just after the peloton caught the group, Van Steenbergen, Louison Bobet, Bernard Gauthier and Hugo Koblet broke away on the steep Kloosterstraat. Gauthier did most of the work in the four-man group for his team leader Bobet. Van Steenbergen, favourite to win in the sprint, paid his earlier efforts and was beaten by Bobet and Koblet. Louison Bobet, a three-time winner of the Tour de France, secured the first ever victory for a French rider in the Tour of Flanders.

Route
The race started in Ghent and finished in Wetteren – totaling 263 km. The course featured four categorized climbs:
 Kluisberg
 Kruisberg
 Edelareberg
 Kloosterstraat (Geraardsbergen)

Results

References

1955
1955 in road cycling
1955 in Belgian sport
1955 Challenge Desgrange-Colombo
March 1955 sports events in Europe